Voznesenovka is a rural locality (a selo) in Ivanovsky Selsoviet of Ivanovsky District, Amur Oblast, Russia. The population was 5 as of 2018. There are 2 streets.

Geography 
Voznesenovka is located 18 km south of Ivanovka (the district's administrative centre) by road. Kreshchenova is the nearest rural locality.

References 

Rural localities in Ivanovsky District, Amur Oblast